ViTrox Corporation Berhad is a Malaysian based electronics company located at Penang, Malaysia. Vitrox specializes in designing and developing automated vision inspection system and equipment testers for the semiconductor and electronic packaging industries as well as electronic communications equipment.

The name ViTrox reflects the core business of the company, which is machine vision and electronics. 

ViTrox's core products are its Machine Vision System (MVS), Automated Board Inspection (ABI) and Electronics Communication System (ECS).

History
ViTrox Technologies was established in 2000 in Penang by Chu Jenn Weng and Steven Siaw Kok Tong who studied together at University Sains Malaysia in the 1990s inside their bedroom garage. Chu had an inspiration of becoming an entrepreneur after visiting Hewlett Packard garage in USA. Therefore, after he had worked in a multinational corporation (MNC) for several years, he roped in Siaw as a business partner to handle the operations and marketing parts of business while Chu focus on the technical sides of the operations. As their business expanded, the business operations was moved from their bedroom garage to the Krystal Point, Bayan Baru. As the business continued to grow, business operations moved to several places.

In 2006, ViTrox secure exclusive contracts with SRM, another Penang based MNC specializing in electric test handler for 10 years estimated to be worth of RM100 million.  
During the financial crisis of 2007–2008, ViTrox Technologies purchased AXI and AOI business unit from Agilent as the former company decides to exit the business to focus on the electronic test.

With the purchase of AXI and AOI from Agilent, ViTrox Technologies now have 4 different segments of business units which are system integrator and provider of high-speed machine vision inspection systems, automated optical inspection, X-Ray inspection and electronics communication systems to cater different kind of vision test for different segments of customer bases in semiconductor related industries worldwide. ViTrox key customers are in the back-end semi-conductor assembly and packaging industry as well as the electronics manufacturing and contract manufacturing industry.

In 2013, ViTrox have an internal target of "555 strategy" which meant have the annual turnover of MYR500 million, have 500 employees by the end of 2015. But as the year 2015 is reaching near with the target is nowhere near the sights, Chu switched its plans to "Asia Expansion Strategy" whereby they are focusing in Asia regions naming China, Taiwan, Japan, Korea, Indonesia and Philippines.

Business unit
ViTrox is specialized in machine vision system (MVS), automated optical inspection (AOI), and automated X-ray inspection (AXI) system.

Office Locations
Currently, there are total of 8 offices branches across the globe.

Local Offices
 Penang, Batu Kawan Industrial Park (Headquarter/ViTrox Campus 2.0)
 Penang, Bayan Lepas Phase IV (ViTrox Innovation Center)
 Selangor, Cyberjaya, Multimedia University, Faculty of Computing and Informatics (ViTrox Vision Lab, R&D Center and Application Center)
 Malacca (Service Center for Southern Malaysia & Singapore)

Overseas Offices
 Thailand (Service Center for Thailand)
 China, Suzhou (Service Center & Marketing Office For China)
 China, Shenzhen (ViTrox Shenzhen Demo Centre)
 United States, California, Fremont (Service Center & R&D Center)
 Germany, Lohr am Main (Service Center & Marketing Office For Europe)

References

External links
Company Overview of ViTrox Corporation Berhad, bloomberg.com

2000 establishments in Malaysia
Electronics companies of Malaysia
Companies listed on Bursa Malaysia
Malaysian companies established in 2000
Electronics companies established in 2000
2008 mergers and acquisitions